Litang may refer to:

Litang County (理塘县), Sichuan
Litang, Guangxi (黎塘镇), town in Binyang County
Li Tang (hall of worship) (禮堂), place to perform religious rituals and to learn the teachings of Confucius
Li Tang (梨汤), a hot pear broth